James F. Byrnes High School is located in Duncan, South Carolina.  It is named after the former Governor of South Carolina and U.S. Secretary of State, James F. Byrnes. The James F. Byrnes Freshman Academy is situated at the former location of D. R. Hill Middle School.

Notable alumni

Bobby Bentley, University of South Florida Football staff 2021-Present, University of South Carolina Football staff 2016–2021, Auburn University Football staff 2014–2016, and former Presbyterian College Head Football Coach
Scott Cooper, Wofford College Philadelphia Phillies (1994) pitcher. minor league system. Career ending shoulder injury in 1995.
Everett Dawkins, Tampa Bay Buccaneers and former Florida State University defensive tackle
Chas Dodd, former Rutgers University quarterback, All-Big East Freshman Team
Steven Duggar (born 1993), Major League Baseball player for the San Francisco Giants
Daniel Gossett, Major League Baseball pitcher for the Oakland Athletics
Willy Korn, Coastal Carolina University Co-Offensive Coordinator and Quarterbacks Coach, and former Clemson University and North Greenville University quarterback
Marcus Lattimore, San Francisco 49ers and former University of South Carolina running back, National Freshman of the Year, 2009 SC Mr. Football
Samuel J. Locklear, US Navy 4-star Admiral
Prince Miller, Saskatchewan Roughriders and former Detroit Lions and University of Georgia cornerback, 2005 SC Mr. Football
Bradley Robinson, Edmonton Eskimos and former Middle Tennessee State University cornerback

See also
List of high schools in South Carolina

References

External links
 
 Rebel Touchdown Club
 Byrnes Rebel Regiment

Public high schools in South Carolina
Schools in Spartanburg County, South Carolina